Ukraine competed at the 2019 Winter Deaflympics held between 12 and 21 December 2019 in Province of Sondrio in Northern Italy. Most medals were won in cross-country skiing and the country finished in 3rd place in the medal table with a total of four gold medals, four silver medals and three bronze medals.

Medalists

Chess 

Tatiana Baklanova won the silver medal in the women's blitz tournament.

Ukraine also won the gold medal in the women's team tournament.

Cross-country skiing 

Pavlo Mandziuk won the silver medal in the men's sprint classic event.

Dmytro Mazhaiev won the gold medal in the men's 10 kilometres pursuit free technique event. Ruslan Denysenko finished in 3rd place in this event. Mazhaiev also won the gold medals in the men's 5 kilometres individual and men's 10 kilometres pursuit events.

Yelizaveta Nopriienko won the bronze medal in the women's 6.6 km pursuit free technique event.

She also won the bronze medal in the women's 5 km free technique event.

Curling 

Ukraine competed in both the men's event and women's event.

References 

Winter Deaflympics
Nations at the 2019 Winter Deaflympics